Berkshire, Hampshire, Franklin, and Hampden is a district of the Massachusetts Senate since 2013. It covers an area of 1,529.5 square miles across the expanse of Berkshire, Hampshire, Hampden and Franklin counties. Democrat Adam Hinds of Pittsfield has represented the district since 2017. Hinds is running unopposed for re-election in the 2020 Massachusetts general election.

The current district geographic boundary overlaps with those of the Massachusetts House of Representatives' 1st Berkshire, 2nd Berkshire, 3rd Berkshire, 4th Berkshire, 1st Franklin, and 1st Hampshire districts.

The district had been used from 1989 through 2003 before it was eliminated in redistricting.

List of senators

See also
 Other Hampden County districts of the Massachusett Senate: Hampden; 1st Hampden and Hampshire; 2nd Hampden and Hampshire
 Other Hampshire County districts of the Massachusett Senate: 1st Hampden and Hampshire; 2nd Hampden and Hampshire; Hampshire, Franklin and Worcester
 Berkshire County districts of the Massachusetts House of Representatives: 1st, 2nd, 3rd, 4th
 Franklin County districts of the Massachusetts House of Representatives: 1st, 2nd
 Hampden County districts of the Massachusetts House of Representatives: 1st, 2nd, 3rd, 4th, 5th, 6th, 7th, 8th, 9th, 10th, 11th, 12th
 Hampshire County districts of the Massachusetts House of Representatives: 1st, 2nd, 3rd

References

External links
  (State Senate district information based on U.S. Census Bureau's American Community Survey).
 League of Women Voters of Williamstown
 League of Women Voters of Massachusetts Central Berkshire County Unit
 League of Women Voters of Franklin County

Senate Berkshire, Hampshire, Franklin, and Hampden
Massachusetts Senate
Government of Franklin County, Massachusetts
Government of Hampshire County, Massachusetts
Government of Hampden County, Massachusetts
Government of Berkshire County, Massachusetts